Enrique Ricky Martín Morales (born December 24, 1971) is a Puerto Rican singer, songwriter, and actor. He is known for his musical versatility, with his discography spanning Latin pop, pop, dance, reggaeton, and salsa genres. Dubbed the "King of Latin Pop", the "King of Latin Music", and the "Latin Pop God", he is regarded as one of the most influential artists in the world. Born in San Juan, Martin began appearing in television commercials at age nine and began his musical career at twelve, as a member of Puerto Rican boy band Menudo. He began his solo career in 1991 while in Sony Music Mexico, gaining recognition in Latin America with the release of his first two studio albums, Ricky Martin (1991) and Me Amaras (1993), both of which were focused on ballads.

Martin's third album, A Medio Vivir (1995), helped him rise to prominence in European countries. The chart-topping single "María", incorporated a mixture of Latin music genres and became his first international hit. His international success was further solidified with his fourth album, Vuelve (1998). The album, which earned Martin his first Grammy Award, spawned chart-topping songs "Vuelve" and "La Copa de la Vida". Martin performed the latter at the 41st Annual Grammy Awards, which was greeted with a massive standing ovation and is known as a game-changer for Latin music worldwide. His first English album, Ricky Martin (1999) became his first US Billboard 200 number one. The lead single "Livin' la Vida Loca" topped both the Billboard Hot 100 and the UK Singles Chart. Martin's success in the late 1990s is generally seen as the beginning of the "Latin explosion". He has been credited for propelling the Latin pop music genre to mainstream recognition, paving the way for a large number of Latin artists to achieve global success.

Martin has since established his status as a pop icon and a sex symbol, releasing several successful albums, including all-time Latin bestsellers Almas del Silencio (2003) and MTV Unplugged (2006), as well as Grammy Award winner A Quien Quiera Escuchar (2015). He has also amassed many successful singles and chart-toppers, including "She Bangs", "Nobody Wants to Be Lonely", "Tal Vez", "Tu Recuerdo", "La Mordidita", "Vente Pa' Ca", and "Canción Bonita". As an actor, Martin gained popularity and stardom for his role in the hit soap opera General Hospital (1994–1996), while his portrayal of Antonio D'Amico in The Assassination of Gianni Versace: American Crime Story (2018) marked the acting opportunity of his career, garnering him an Emmy nomination. He also starred as Ché in the Broadway revival of the musical Evita in 2012, which broke the theater's box-office sales record seven times.

Martin is one of the best-selling Latin music artists of all time, having sold over 70 million records worldwide. He has scored 11 Billboard Hot Latin Songs number-one songs, and won over 200 awards (most awarded male Latin artist), including two Grammy Awards, five Latin Grammy Awards, five MTV Video Music Awards (tied for most wins by a Latin artist), two American Music Awards, three Latin American Music Awards, three Billboard Music Awards, nine Billboard Latin Music Awards, eight World Music Awards, fourteen Lo Nuestro Awards, a Guinness World Record, and a star on the Hollywood Walk of Fame. He is ranked among the Greatest Latin Artists of All Time, the Greatest Music Video Artists of All Time, and the Most Influential Latin Artists of All Time by Billboard. His philanthropy and activism focus on LGBT rights and fighting against human trafficking; in 2004, he founded The Ricky Martin Foundation, a non-profit, non-governmental organization that focuses on denouncing human trafficking and educating about the crime's existence.

Early life 

Enrique Martín Morales was born on December 24, 1971, in San Juan, Puerto Rico. His mother, Doña Nereida Morales, is a former accountant; his father, Enrique Martín Negroni, is a former psychologist who previously worked as a regional supervisor for a Puerto Rican mental-health agency. His parents divorced when he was two years old, and although his mother had custody of Martin, he could also move freely between his father's house in the middle-class suburb of University Gardens in San Juan, and his paternal grandmother's house nearby. In an interview with People, he told the magazine that he "never had to make decisions" about who he loved more, and he was "always happy". Martin has two older maternal half-brothers, Fernando and Ángel Fernández, two younger paternal half-brothers, Eric and Daniel Martín, and a younger paternal half-sister, Vanessa Martín. Martin has Spanish heritage of Basque and Canarian descent. As he explained to ABC, the Martins traveled from Spain to Puerto Rico in 1779. He also has some Corsican origin through his paternal grandmother.

Martin grew up Catholic. The people closest to him called him "Kiki" (a nickname that comes from Enrique). He began singing at age six, using wooden kitchen spoons as make-believe microphones; he often sang songs by Puerto Rican boy band Menudo, as well as English-language rock groups such as Led Zeppelin, Journey, and REO Speedwagon. His mother's side of the family was musically inclined and his maternal grandfather was a poet. Martin later reflected on his time spent with his family as a child: "Every time I find myself in front of an audience, be it twenty people or one hundred thousand, once again I feel the energy that consumed me back at the family gatherings of my youth." He attended Colegio Sagrado Corazón, a bilingual Catholic grade school in University Gardens since fourth grade and was an "average" student there. When he was nine years old, he began appearing in television commercials for products such as soft drinks, toothpaste, and fast food restaurants, including Orange Crush and Burger King. In a year and a half, he starred in 11 commercials.

Career

1983–1989: Menudo 

After achieving moderate fame in his country for his appearances in television commercials, Martin auditioned for membership in Menudo. Formed in Puerto Rico in 1977, Menudo members were usually replaced when they hit 16 in order to keep the band "full of fresh-faced members". Although the executives enjoyed his dancing and singing at his first two auditions, Martin was rejected because he was too short. By the third audition, his persistence impressed executives, and in 1984, 12-year-old Martin became a member. A month after joining Menudo, he made his debut performance with the group at the Luis A. Ferré Performing Arts Center in San Juan. During this performance, he inadvertently disobeyed the choreography by walking around the stage, when it was planned that he would stay still, and was chastised by the band manager after the show: "The mistake was such a big deal that from that moment on, never again did I move when I wasn't supposed to move. That was the discipline of Menudo: You either did things the way you were told or you were not part of the group." Although Martin enjoyed traveling and performing onstage with Menudo, he found the band's busy schedule and strict management exhausting, and later reflected that the experience "cost" him his childhood. Despite this, Martin acknowledged his "opportunity to have so many amazing experiences with so many amazing people" during his time with the group.

During his time with Menudo, he became a "key-member of the group" and a "fan-favorite", while the band released 11 albums, including the Grammy-nominated Evolución (1984) and their highest-charting and longest-running album on the US Billboard 200, Menudo (1985). The former featured Martin's debut single, "Rayo de Luna" and the latter included the hit single "Hold Me". "Hold Me" became the group's first and only entry on the US Billboard Hot 100 chart, peaking at number 62. It was ranked among the "100 Greatest Boy Band Songs of All Time" by Billboard, the "75 Greatest Boy Band Songs of All Time" by Rolling Stone, and the "30 Best Boy Band Songs" by Complex. Besides the musical career, Martin appeared with other members of Menudo in the American romantic comedy/drama television series, The Love Boat (1985), and the Argentine soap opera, Por Siempre Amigos (1987). He also developed an interest in philanthropy when the group became UNICEF ambassadors, often working with impoverished children in third world countries. His experiences as an ambassador affected him greatly and inspired him to continue working with charities later in his life.

Finally, Martin left the band in July 1989, at age 17, hoping to rest and evaluate his career path; he stayed a few extra months after his "age-mandated retirement" came around. He performed his final show with the group at the same venue where he had performed his first performance as a member. Referred to as the "Most Iconic Latino Pop Music Band", Menudo was ranked as one of the Biggest Boy Bands of All Time by Us Weekly in 2021. The group has sold around 20 million records worldwide, and has been acknowledged as the "Most Successful Latin Boy Band of All Time" by Billboard. Martin returned to Puerto Rico to "get a break from the pressures of the group, the promotional tours, and the constant stress of work", but although his parents' divorce had not affected him before, suddenly began to affect him; his parents "began fighting more than ever" and they were forcing him to "choose between the two people in the world" he loved most. As he understood they did this because they loved him and wanted the best for him, he "forgave all of the pain and anger they caused" him. He graduated from the high school, and 13 days after turning 18, he moved to New York City to celebrate his financial independence; since he was a minor during his time with Menudo, Martin was not allowed to access his own bank accounts.

1990–1994: Acting and first solo albums 
Martin was accepted into New York University's Tisch School of the Arts in 1990, but before classes began, his friend invited him to Mexico City. He attended the musical comedy play, Mama Ama el Rock there, and was offered to stay and replace one of the actors. He accepted the offer, dropped out the university and moved from New York to Mexico City to perform in the play. While he was performing onstage in Mama Ama el Rock, a producer in the audience took notice of Martin's acting and offered him a role in the Mexican telenovela Alcanzar una estrella (1990). Martin also joined the cast for the second season of the show, titled Alcanzar una estrella II (1991). A film based on the TV series, titled Más que alcanzar una estrella (1992), was also produced in which Martin starred, and earned him an El Heraldo Award for his role.

A Sony Discos executive noticed Martin's acting in the soap operas and offered him his first solo music recording contract. Eager to record his first solo album and hustled by the executive, Martin signed the contract without reading its conditions and inadvertently signed a deal in which he would only be paid one cent for each album sold. Despite viewing the contract as unfair, Martin referred to the record as "the start of something phenomenal" for him. After working "around the clock" to finish filming Alcanzar una estrella II and recording music, he released his debut solo album, Ricky Martin, on November 26, 1991. The album peaked at number five on the US Billboard Latin Pop Albums chart and spent a total of 41 weeks on the list. It sold over 500,000 copies worldwide, was certified gold in several countries, and spawned his first solo hit singles, "Fuego Contra Fuego", "El Amor de Mi Vida", and "Dime Que Me Quieres". Both "Fuego Contra Fuego" and "El Amor de Mi Vida" reached the top 10 on the US Billboard Hot Latin Tracks. To promote the album, Martin embarked on a successful Latin American tour, breaking box office records, which the singer referred to as "an indescribable feeling, almost like coming home".

After the success of Ricky Martin and its subsequent tour, Martin's record company met him with the Spanish musician Juan Carlos Calderón to work on his second studio album, Me Amaras (1993). Although Martin felt "very grateful" for the opportunity to work with Calderón, he noted, "I always felt that that record was more his than mine." The album sold over one million copies worldwide and was certified triple-platinum in Chile. In 1994, Martin's agent encouraged him to move to Los Angeles to act in an American sitcom called Getting By. The show was canceled after two seasons, but soon afterward, Martin was given the role of Miguel Morez on the popular hit soap opera General Hospital; Morez, a bartender and singer, known for his long and flowing hair, was a Puerto Rican citizen hiding in the United States from his lover's criminal mastermind father and created a love triangle with his fiancé Lily Rivera and Brenda. Martin portrayed the role for two years and gained huge popularity and stardom, becoming "one of the most-talked about actors on the soap opera". Despite this, Martin felt he lacked chemistry with the rest of the General Hospital cast and observed that people treated him differently because of his Puerto Rican accent. At the time, it was relatively uncommon for Latin actors to appear on American television, and people suggested that he take accent reduction classes, which he refused.

1995–1997: Breakthrough with A Medio Vivir 

In 1995, Martin refocused on his music career, and began working on his third studio album, A Medio Vivir. The album was released in September 1995, and became a huge success; it sold over three million copies worldwide. being certified gold in the United States, platinum in France, 4× platinum in Spain, as well as many other certifications in Latin American countries. It spawned several successful hits, including "Te Extraño, Te Olvido, Te Amo", "María", and "Volverás". On "María", which was released as the second single from the album, Martin allowed himself "to go into a very Latin, African sound". He created a mix of different Latin music genres instead of singing a romantic ballad, the style that he focused on it in his first two albums, while Latin pop music in general was mainly made up of it at the time. Although Martin was satisfied with the track and he describes it as a song that he is "extremely proud of", the first time he played it for a record label executive, the man said: "Are you crazy? You have ruined your career! I can't believe you are showing me this. You're finished — this is going to be your last album." Despite this, the track became Martin's breakthrough song and his first international hit. It topped the charts in 20 countries, and has sold over five million physical copies worldwide. As a result, the song was featured in the 1999 edition of The Guinness Book of Records as the biggest Latin hit.

In Australia, "María" spent six weeks at number one, topped the country's year-end chart in 1998, and was certified platinum. The song also spent nine weeks at number one in France, and was certified diamond, selling over 1.4 million copies there. Additionally, the track reached the top 10 in the United Kingdom, and became Martin's first entry on the US Billboard Hot 100 chart. To promote A Medio Vivir, he embarked on the worldwide A Medio Vivir Tour, that lasted for more than two years, through which he performed 63 shows and visited Europe, Latin America and the United States. During an interview with The Miami Herald in 1996, Martin expressed an interest in performing on Broadway. In a few days, he received a phone call from producer Richard Jay-Alexander, and was offered the role of Marius Pontmercy in the play Les Misérables. After the conclusion of the A Medio Vivir Tour in Latin America, Martin returned to New York to appear in the play in an eleven-week run. He greatly enjoyed the experience, calling his time in the play an "honor" and "the role of [his] life". Martin continued to tour after the conclusion of the show's run, and noted that his audiences were growing in both size and enthusiasm.

1998–1999: Vuelve 
While the A Medio Vivir Tour had not been concluded yet, Martin returned to the studio to record his fourth album Vuelve. He called the experience of touring and recording at the same time "brutal and incredibly intense". As he was finishing the record in 1997, "María" caught the attention of FIFA. They contacted Martin and asked him to create a song as the 1998 FIFA World Cup anthem. He stated about the request: "I have to admit that the challenge made me a bit nervous, but the massive growth potential for my career was such that I decided to accept." Following his acceptance, musicians K.C. Porter, Robi Rosa, and Desmond Child joined him and they started working on a song titled "La Copa de la Vida" (English: "The Cup of Life"). Martin wrote about the recording:

"La Copa de la Vida" was included on Vuelve, released February 12, 1998. The album became a huge success; it sold over eight million copies worldwide, becoming the best-selling Spanish-language album in history, according to his label. Also, some sources have reported the album's sales as six million copies worldwide. It spent 26 weeks atop the US Billboard Top Latin Albums chart and was certified platinum by the Recording Industry Association of America (RIAA). In Canada, the album peaked at number three and was certified  double platinum. Vuelve spawned big hits, including the title track, "La Copa de la Vida", "Perdido Sin Ti", and "La Bomba". "La Copa de la Vida" grew to be an international success, appearing on the charts in more than 60 countries, and reaching number one in 30 countries, Both "Vuelve" and "Perdido Sin Ti" peaked at number one on the US Billboard Hot Latin Tracks chart; the former also reached number one in eight countries. On July 12, 1998, Martin performed "La Copa de la Vida" as the official anthem at the 1998 FIFA World Cup Final in France, in front of more than a billion TV viewers around the world.

To promote Vuelve, Martin embarked on the worldwide Vuelve Tour; he performed in Asia, Australia, Europe, Mexico, South America, and the United States. Although Latin music was not important to the Recording Academy or the mainstream music industry at the time, Tommy Mottola, then-chief of Columbia Records, was certain about Martin's stardom and pushed hard to have him on the Grammy Awards ceremony. During an interview with Billboard, Mottola told the magazine about it: "There was tremendous resistance from the Grammys. They did not want an 'unknown' to perform, yet we he had already sold 10 million copies of Vuelve worldwide. To me, that was absolutely UNACCEPTABLE." Finally, on February 24, 1999, cavorting with a 15-piece band alongside and a large number of dancers and percussionists, Martin performed a bilingual version of "La Copa de La Vida" at the 41st Annual Grammy Awards, which was greeted with a massive standing ovation and met with acclaim from music critics. At the same night, Vuelve earned Martin his first Grammy award, for Best Latin Pop Performance.

1999–2000: Crossover to English

In October 1998, CNN confirmed that Martin has been working on his first English language album, following the huge success of Vuelve. The album was titled Ricky Martin and was released on May 11, 1999, two weeks ahead of schedule, because of the huge interest in the disc, following Martin's performance at the Grammy Awards. Tim Devin, the general manager of Tower Records stated about Martin: "He's always been one of our strongest Latin artists, but interest in him has picked up considerably since that performance." Ricky Martin debuted atop the US Billboard 200 with first-week sales of 661,000 copies, becoming the largest sales week by any album in 1999. It also broke the record as the largest first-week sales for any pop or Latin artist in history, as well as any Columbia Records artist during the SoundScan era. With this album, Martin became the first male Latin act in history to debut at number one on the US Billboard 200 chart. It was certified 7× platinum by RIAA, denoting shipments of over seven million copies in the US and breaking the record as the best-selling album by a Latin artist in the country. Only within three months, Ricky Martin became the best-selling album ever by a Latin artist. According to different sources, the album has sold over 15 million copies or even 17 million copies worldwide. It was nominated for Best Pop Album at the 42nd Annual Grammy Awards.

The album's lead single "Livin' la Vida Loca" topped the charts in more than 20 countries and is considered to be Martin's biggest hit, and one of the best-selling singles of all time. In the United States, it topped the Billboard Hot 100 chart for five consecutive weeks, becoming Martin's first number one single on the chart. Additionally, it broke several records on Billboard charts. It also spent eight consecutive weeks atop the Canada Top Singles chart and topped the country's year-end chart. In the United Kingdom, it debuted at number one and stayed there for three weeks, making Martin the first Puerto Rican artist in history to hit number one. The track was ranked as the best '90s pop song by Elle, and was listed among the Best Latin Songs of All Time by Billboard. It was nominated for four categories at the 42nd Annual Grammy Awards, including Record of the Year and Song of the Year. Its Spanish version reached the summit of the Billboard Hot Latin Tracks chart, and was nominated for Record of the Year at the 1st Annual Latin Grammy Awards. "She's All I Ever Had" was released as the second single from the album in June 1999. It peaked at numbers two and three on the US Billboard Hot 100 and Canada Top Singles charts, respectively. The Spanish version, "Bella" topped the charts in five countries, as well as Billboards Hot Latin Tracks chart. To further promote Ricky Martin, he embarked on the worldwide Livin' la Vida Loca Tour, which was the highest-grossing tour of 2000 by a Latin artist in the US.

2000–2005: Sound Loaded, Almas del Silencio, and Life 
While the Livin' la Vida Loca Tour had not been concluded yet, Martin returned to the studio to record his sixth studio album, Sound Loaded. The album was released on November 14, 2000. It debuted at number four on the Billboard 200 with first-week sales of 318,000 copies. The album has sold over seven million copies or even eight million copies worldwide, according to different sources, being certified double platinum in the US. The album featured two hit singles, "She Bangs" and "Nobody Wants to Be Lonely". The former reached number one in seven countries, including Italy and Sweden, as well as the top five in Australia, Canada, the United Kingdom, and several other countries. It was nominated for Best Male Pop Vocal Performance at the 43rd Annual Grammy Awards. The Spanish-language version of "She Bangs" reached the summit of the Hot Latin Tracks chart and won the Latin Grammy Award for Best Music Video at the 2nd Annual Latin Grammy Awards. "Nobody Wants to Be Lonely" was re-recorded along with American singer Christina Aguilera, peaking at number one in five countries, as well as the top five in Italy, Germany, Spain, and the United Kingdom, among others. It was nominated for Best Pop Collaboration with Vocals at the 44th Annual Grammy Awards. The solo Spanish version, entitled "Sólo Quiero Amarte" topped the Hot Latin Tracks chart. Both "She Bangs" and "Nobody Wants to Be Lonely" are certified silver in the UK. In February 2001, Martin released a Spanish compilation album entitled La Historia, which spent five weeks at number one on the Top Latin Albums chart, topped the charts in Argentina and Sweden, and was certified quadruple Latin platinum in the United States.

Following the success of Ricky Martin and Sound Loaded, he initially planned to release the third English-language album as his seventh studio album, which was supposed to be his first complete work in the field of songwriting. Despite Sony Music Entertainment's original plan, he decided to release a Spanish-language album: "I woke up five months ago, and I said 'We're doing an album in Spanish.' Everyone went nuts. They said, 'You don't have time; you have to release an album in English because of timing issues with your career.' And that's fine. But I told them, 'In five months, you'll have a kick-ass album' [in Spanish]. Martin's seventh studio album, Almas del Silencio was released in May 2003. It debuted atop the Billboard Top Latin Albums chart with first-week sales of 65,000 copies, according to data compiled by Nielsen SoundScan, breaking the record as the largest first-week sales for a Spanish-language album in the US. The album also debuted at number 12 on Billboard 200, tying the 2002 album, Quizás as the chart's highest Spanish-language debut. The album also debuted at number one in "at least 13 Latin American markets" and sold over two million copies worldwide.

Almas del Silencio spawned three Hot Latin Tracks chart-topper hits: "Tal Vez", "Jaleo", and "Y Todo Queda en Nada". "Tal Vez" debuted at number one on the Billboard Hot Latin Tracks chart on the week of April 12, 2003, marking the first number one debut since February 1998, and becoming the sixth song overall in the chart's history to do so. It spent a total of 11 weeks at this position, surpassing "Livin' la Vida Loca" as Martin's longest number-one single on the chart, and was the longest-running number one of 2003. It also topped the charts in several Latin American markets. In October 2005, Martin released his third English album, Life. He commented on the album: "I was really in touch with my emotions. I think this album is very multi-layered, just like life is. It's about feeling anger. It's about feeling joy. It's about feeling uncertainty. It's about feeling. And all my emotions are part of this production". To promote Life, Martin embarked on the worldwide One Night Only with Ricky Martin tour.

2006–2012: MTV Unplugged, Música + Alma + Sexo, and Evita 
Although Martin's team and MTV had discussed an MTV Unplugged for years, but it became more serious after Martin's the One Night Only tour, which featured an acoustic segment. Finally, Martin taped his MTV Unplugged set in Miami in August 2006, performing both romantic ballads and up-tempo tropical dance songs. During the performance, he debuted three new tracks, including "Tu Recuerdo", which was released to radio stations as the lead single from his debut live album MTV Unplugged (2006). The album debuted at number one on the Top Latin Albums chart and sold over two million copies worldwide, marking his highest-certified album in Mexico. It won two Latin Grammy awards and was nominated for Album of the Year. "Tu Recuerdo" reached number one in five countries, as well as the Billboards Hot Latin Songs and Latin Pop Airplay charts. The track was certified quadruple platinum in Mexico and was nominated for Record of the Year at the 8th Annual Latin Grammy Awards. The artist then embarked on the Black and White Tour in 2007, including four sold-out shows at the José Miguel Agrelot Coliseum in Puerto Rico. The concerts in Puerto Rico were compiled into his second live album Ricky Martin... Live Black & White Tour (2007). Later that year, he released his first Italian song, "Non siamo soli" as a duet with Italian singer Eros Ramazzotti. The song debuted at number one in Italy and spent eleven consecutive weeks atop the chart.

In January 2011, Martin launched his ninth studio album, Música + Alma + Sexo. The album debuted at number three on the US Billboard 200 chart, becoming the highest-charting primarily-Spanish language set since Dreaming of You (1995) by American singer Selena. It holds the record as the highest-charting Latin album of the 2010s, and represents the highest-ever chart debut on the Billboard 200 for a Sony Music Latin release. Música + Alma + Sexo also peaked at number one in Argentina and Venezuela, as well as Billboards Top Latin Albums. Its lead single, "Lo Mejor de Mi Vida Eres Tú" (English: "The Best Thing About Me Is You") reached number one on the US Billboard Hot Latin Songs chart and was nominated for Record of the Year, Song of the Year, and Best Short Form Music Video at the 12th Annual Latin Grammy Awards. To promote the album, Martin embarked on the Música + Alma + Sexo World Tour in 2011. In February 2012, he appeared as Spanish teacher David Martinez on the twelfth episode of the third season of the American musical television series Glee, The Spanish Teacher. Martin starred as Ché in the Broadway revival of the musical Evita from March 2012 to January 2013. The show became a hit, breaking the theatre's box-office sales record after only six performances. Since then, it broke its own record six times and was nominated for Best Revival of a Musical at the 66th Tony Awards. The show's soundtrack album debuted at number one on Billboards cast album chart.

2013–2018: The Voice, A Quien Quiera Escuchar, and The Assassination of Gianni Versace 

Martin served as a coach on the second season of the Australian singing competition television series The Voice in 2013. In the same year, he released a compilation album, entitled Greatest Hits: Souvenir Edition, which reached number two in Australia, as well as a new single, entitled "Come with Me", which debuted at number three in the country. The artist then embarked on the
Ricky Martin Live tour in Australia in October 2013. He continued serving as a coach on both the third and fourth seasons of The Voice Australia in 2014 and 2015, respectively. In 2014, Lars Brandle from Billboard stated in an article: "Through his high-profile slot on The Voice, Ricky's profile in Australia has never been as big as it is right now." On February 25, 2014, Wisin released a song titled "Adrenalina" from his album El Regreso del Sobreviviente, which featured Jennifer Lopez and Martin, and became the Univision's 2014 World Cup song. It received commercial success, peaking in the top-five of Bulgaria, Mexico, Spain, and Billboards Hot Latin Songs chart. Its accompanying music video has accumulated over 850 million views on YouTube. Later that year, Martin released his single "Vida" for the 2014 FIFA World Cup. The song reached the top five in Spain and on the US Hot Latin Songs chart. Also in 2014, he served as a coach on the fourth season of The Voice Mexico, and embarked on the Live in Mexico tour.

In February 2015, Martin released his tenth studio album, A Quien Quiera Escuchar. The album debuted at number one on Billboards Top Latin Albums chart and peaked at number one in Argentina. It won the award for Best Latin Pop Album at the 58th Annual Grammy Awards and Album of the Year at the 1st Latin American Music Awards. The album spawned three Hot Latin Songs top-10 hits: "Adiós", "Disparo al Corazón", and "La Mordidita". "Disparo al Corazón" was nominated for both Record of the Year and Song of the Year at the 16th Annual Latin Grammy Awards. "La Mordidita" experienced huge commercial success, being certified 15× Latin platinum in the United States. Its accompanying music video has received over 1.2 billion views on YouTube. To promote the album, Martin embarked on the One World Tour from 2015 to 2017. He served as an executive producer and a judge on the American singing competition series La Banda, which premiered in 2015 and 2016 on Univision. The first season was "looking for the next Latin boy band", while the second season was looking for a Latin girl band. The contestants would compete for a recording deal with Sony Music Latin and Syco Music. CNCO, known as the first boy band to make reggaeton, was the winner of the first season. Martin became their manager and produced the band's debut album, Primera Cita (2016), along with Wisin; the album debuted at number one on Top Latin Albums and featured the hit single "Reggaetón Lento (Bailemos)". CNCO opened many dates on One World Tour in 2016. In 2020, Leila Cobo from Billboard compared the group with Menudo, noting: "Not since Menudo had a Latin boy band melted our hearts or made us dance quite like CNCO".

On September 23, 2016, Martin released a song called "Vente Pa' Ca", featuring Colombian singer Maluma.  The song became one of the biggest Spanish-language songs of 2016, reaching number one in seven countries, as well as Billboards Latin Airplay, Latin Pop Airplay, and Tropical Airplay charts. It also reached top five in Spain and on the Billboard Hot Latin Songs, being certified quadruple platinum in Spain and diamond in Mexico.  The track was nominated for both Record of the Year and Song of the Year at the 18th Annual Latin Grammy Awards. The accompanying music video has received over 1.75 billion views on YouTube. Martin signed a concert residency, named All In, to perform at the Monte Carlo Resort and Casino in Las Vegas in 2017 and 2018. He portrayed fashion designer Gianni Versace's partner Antonio D'Amico in the FX true crime anthology television series The Assassination of Gianni Versace: American Crime Story, marking "the acting opportunity of his career". The role garnered him a nomination for Outstanding Supporting Actor In A Limited Series Or Movie at the 70th Primetime Emmy Awards. Running from January to March 2018, The Assassination of Gianni Versace received generally favorable reviews and numerous awards and nominations, including three Primetime Emmy Awards, four Creative Arts Emmy Awards, two Golden Globe Awards, two Critics' Choice Television Awards, and a Screen Actors Guild Award. In February 2018, Martin released a song titled "Fiebre", featuring Wisin & Yandel. The song was commercially successful in Latin America, reaching number one in Chile, Ecuador, Guatemala, Mexico, and Uruguay. It also reached the summit of the Billboard Latin Airplay and Latin Rhythm Airplay charts.

2019–present: Amici di Maria De Filippi, PausaPlay, and Jingle Jangle: A Christmas Journey 

At the 61st Annual Grammy Awards, Martin performed "Havana", "Pégate", and "Mi Gente", alongside Camila Cabello, J Balvin, Young Thug, and Arturo Sandoval, as the opening performance. Martin served as a coach on the eighteenth season of the Italian talent show Amici di Maria De Filippi in 2019. In the same year, Maluma released a song called "No Se Me Quita" from his album 11:11, which featured Martin. The song reached number one in Mexico and was certified quadruple platinum in the country. Martin hosted the 20th Annual Latin Grammy Awards in November 2019, along with Roselyn Sánchez and Paz Vega. The artist started recording his eleventh studio album, initially titled Movimiento, in the  second half of 2019, inspired by the 2019 political protests in Puerto Rico. He embarked on the Movimiento Tour in 2020. Because of the COVID-19 pandemic and subsequent personal experiences, he decided to split the tour's associated album in two extended plays, Pausa and Play; the former was released in May 2020, while the latter is set to release in May 2022.

Pausa was nominated for Album of the Year and won the award for Best Pop Vocal Album at the 21st Annual Latin Grammy Awards. The second single from the EP, "Tiburones" reached number one in Argentina and Puerto Rico, and was also nominated for Song of the Year at the 21st Annual Latin Grammy Awards. Martin starred as the voice of villainous miniature figure Don Juan Diego in the American Christmas musical fantasy film Jingle Jangle: A Christmas Journey. The film was released on Netflix on November 13, 2020, and received generally favorable reviews. In April 2021, Martin released his hit single "Canción Bonita" with Colombian singer Carlos Vives, which experienced huge commercial success in Latin America, reaching number one in 12 countries. It was also nominated for Song of the Year and Best Pop Song at the 22nd Annual Latin Grammy Awards. Later that year, he embarked on his first co-headlining tour, the Enrique Iglesias and Ricky Martin Live in Concert alongside Spanish singer Enrique Iglesias. Martin released Play on July 13, 2022. The EP included singles "Otra Noche en L.A." and "A Veces Bien Y A Veces Mal"; the former reached number one in four countries.

Artistry

Influences 

As a child, Martin used to sing songs by Menudo and rock bands such as Led Zeppelin, Journey, and REO Speedwagon, which were what his "older siblings were listening to at the time". While Martin and his brothers spent their time listening to classic rock, their mother would interrupt them to make them listen to Latin music. She brought him CDs of Fania All-Stars, Celia Cruz, El Gran Combo de Puerto Rico, and Gilberto Santa Rosa that slowly made him appreciate the richness of Puerto Rican culture. Also, she once took them to a Fania All-Stars concert, which Martin is "beyond grateful" for it. He expresses that thanks to her mother, those influences had a "profound effect" on his musical career. Martin has also cited Elvis Presley, the Beatles, Michael Jackson, and Madonna for teaching him "the beauty of pop". He stated about Madonna: "I was very influenced by her and her music. I know every choreography of Madonna." Additionally, he mentions Carlos Santana, José Feliciano, Celia Cruz, and Gloria Estefan as the artists who paved the way for him, naming Feliciano as one of the people who inspired him when he was a teenager: "I was always fascinated with his music." In addition to the musical influences, Martin is inspired by David Bowie's "ambiguous sexuality". While growing up, he used to ask himself if he wanted to be like the openly gay singer Elton John or he just liked him, admiring his music, colors, and wigs. He has also cited Barbra Streisand as an entertainer he wants to be like: "I want to be an entertainer, not just a singer."

Musical styles and themes 
Considered to be a versatile artist, Martin describes his music as Latin pop, saying: "When you say 'Latin pop', the spectrum is so broad, It's inevitable to not be influenced by everything that’s happening in the industry, but always keeping your identity firm by knowing who you are." He has also described his music as fusion, while noting that he does not "ride the waves that are in fashion at the moment". Music critics have described his songs to be influenced by Latin pop, pop, dance, adult contemporary, ballad, reggaeton, Latin, African, rock, salsa, flamenco, mariachi, urban, samba, cumbia, bachata, merengue, rumba, funk, bomba, batucada, vallenato, reggae, dancehall, bolero, mambo, Europop, house, disco, EDM, dance-pop, electro, house, techno, dubstep, world music, Middle Eastern, folk-pop, bossa nova, alternative rock, pop rock, soft pop, soft rock, heavy metal, R&B, religious, jazz, soul, trap, hip-hop, acoustic, electronic, tropical, doo-wop, surf, tango, ska, and rock and roll. Martin sings in Spanish, English, Portuguese, Italian, and French. About his lyrics, Martin has emphasized that although his music will always make the listener dance, it does not mean his lyrics "have to be meaningless" and he sings about love and heartbreak, as well as "things that are good for a society", such as "freedom, freedom of expression, and social justice". He has also declared that as a Latino, he is not afraid of sexuality and sings about sexuality and sensuality, bringing his culture with him onstage.

Voice 
Martin possesses a dramatic tenor vocal range. Peter Gilstrap from Variety commented that his "powerful voice" is "capable of belt or lilt", while The Jerusalem Posts Noa Amouyal described his voice as "soulful" and "very powerful". In 1995, Enrique Lopetegui of the Los Angeles Times noted Martin's "improved vocal skills" on A Medio Vivir. Also from the Los Angeles Times, Ernesto Lechner later praised his vocal for being "charismatic enough to handle both ballads and up-tempo tunes". Similarly, Billboards Chuck Taylor expressed "She's All I Ever Had" boasts "a versatility that contrasts nicely" with Martin's previous single, "Livin' la Vida Loca", labeling his vocal on the former "tender and heartfelt". Steve Gerrard of the Montreal Rocks complimented "his vocal maturity" on A Quien Quiera Escuchar.

Music videos and performances 
Billboard labeled Martin "a video icon", and ranked him as the 79th Greatest Music Video Artist of All Time in 2020, stating: "From the moment he sashayed up to the mic in 'Livin La Vida Loca' all dressed in black, and gave us that look, the Menudo alum became the most memorable and watchable drop-dead handsome guy in pop music." He has collaborated with various directors to produce his music videos, including Carlos Perez, Wayne Isham, Jessy Terrero, Simón Brand, Gustavo Garzón, Nigel Dick, Kacho Lopez, and Memo del Bosque. "Livin' la Vida Loca" was nominated for Video of the Year at the 1999 MTV Video Music Awards, making Martin the first Latin artist in history to receive a nomination in this category. It won a total of five awards at the ceremony, making it rank among the videos with most wins in the history of the MTV Video Music Awards. The explicit sexual scenes of the music video for "She Bangs" were met with criticism from the audience; several American television stations cut the scenes when airing the video. According to the Daily Records John Dingwall, with the visual, Martin ditched his teen idol image by transforming to a more mature one. It was consequently banned in several Latin American countries, such as the Dominican Republic. Martin told MTV News that the video represented freedom rather than his sexuality. The video was awarded Best Music Video at the 2nd Annual Latin Grammy Awards, Best Clip of the Year — Latin at the 2001 Billboard Music Video Awards, and Video of the Year at the 13th Lo Nuestro Awards.

Martin has been noticed for "dance moves of his own" and his "bon-bon shaking dance moves". Carol Sandoval from VIX named him the "best dancer on any stage worldwide", highlighting his hips movement and "successful turns". He was ranked as the ninth best male dancer by the Evening Standard and the tenth Male Singer Who Can Dance by WatchMojo, being the only Latin entertainer on both lists. Writing for The Hollywood Reporter, Scott Feinberg introduced Martin as "an incredible dancer". Billboards Jessica Roiz labeled him "a true showman", noting his "many outfit changes", "various dance performances", and "different stage set for each song". Jon Pareles of The New York Times described him as "an all-around showman" and Varietys Peter Gilstrap called him "every inch the showman", both recognizing his vocal abilities, while the former also commented he is "a dancer as muscular and hard-working as anyone in his troupe", mentioning his "likable, good-hearted character" and "steadfast Puerto Rican pride". Music critics have mostly praised his concerts for the choreographies, video screens, visual effects, stage, Latin influences, and Martin's vocals, costume changes, energy, sensuality, dance moves, and gestures, while the quality of sounds and sound mixes have received mixed reviews. Billboards Marjua Estevez described Martin's performance of "La Copa de la Vida" at the 41st Annual Grammy Awards as "the most memorable Latin performance at a Grammy Awards show", and the publication ranked it as the 54th Greatest Award Show Performance of All Time on their 2017 list. The performance was additionally placed on a 2017 unranked list of "Top 20 Best Grammy Performances of All Time" by Gold Derby, and on a 2019 list of "The Most Unforgettable Grammys Performances of All Time" by InStyle.

Public image
Martin became a teen idol with his debut as a member of Menudo, and a pop icon following global fame as a solo artist. Journalists have written about his humble personality and "beautiful soul". Writing for The Hollywood Reporter, Scott Feinberg introduced Martin as "one of the most acclaimed and admired creative artists ever". La República staff described him as "one of the most admired and desired singers", while authors of ¡Hola! described him as "one of the most respected Latin stars in the world", "one of the most prodigious voices in music in Spanish", and "one of the most beloved talents in the entertainment industry worldwide". Also from ¡Hola!, Cristina Noé named him "one of the most loved artists in the world", while a writer of Clarín named him "one of the most applauded Latin singers on the planet". Metro Puerto Rico stated that he "raised the name of Puerto Rico internationally". He was ranked as one of the top-10 "emerging personalities" of 2010 by Google Zeitgeist, and was the eighth most searched musician on Google in 2022. In 2014, Gay Star News referred to Martin as "the most famous Latin pop star in the world", while Variety described him as "Puerto Rico's arguably most famous son" in 2021. He is ranked as the most famous Latin music artist among millennials and the second-most famous Latin music artist overall in the United States, according to YouGov surveys in 2022.

During the 2000s, Martin was known for "guarding his private life" and being "uncomfortable discussing intimate aspects of his personal life"; he used to insist on asking public to focus on his music and "steered interviewers away from his personal life". However, he chose to live both his "professional and personal life", making his private life public since the early 2010s. In 2021, he went on the cover of People with the title "No More Secrets" and told the magazine that he is "a man with no secrets", stating that he is "more comfortable in his own skin than ever before". Martin is one of the most followed celebrities on social media, with accounts on Instagram, Twitter, Facebook, YouTube, and TikTok. He stated about social media that he wishes he had "something as powerful as" them since his debut: "Obviously I like to have direct contact with the public, with the media. It's extremely important, but today, from my home, I can talk to millions of people and see their immediate reaction." He is noticed for his friendly interactions with his fans, who are called "Sexy Souls". Wax statues of Martin are on display at the Madame Tussauds wax museums in San Francisco, Sydney, and Orlando. The last one was moved from Las Vegas to Orlando for the opening of the museum in spring 2015.

Fashion
Martin is considered to be a sex symbol, and journalists describe him as "the Latin heartthrob". His fashion and style evolution, from "as '80s as you'd expect" during his time with Menudo to "a style groove, often opting for sharp, tailored suits with clean lines" since 2009, has been noticed by the media. Natalia Trejo from ¡Hola! described him as "one of the most stylish Latin men in the entertainment industry", highlighting his "baggy leather pants", "tailored suits", and "color-block blazers" that have marked "some of the noteworthy trends of each decade". The reviewer also commented that Martin is "an example of mixing business with casual" and has "always had a personal sense of style". JD Institute of Fashion Technology views Martin as a fashion icon, praising him for "pushing the fashion boundaries with every new look". In 1997, he went on the cover of People en Españols first edition of 25 Most Beautiful; he has since "been a constant presence" on their 25 or 50 Most Beautiful lists. Two years later, he was featured on the cover of both Rolling Stone and Time magazines.

Martin is considered to be one of the sexiest men in the world, according to various publications. In 2012, he was voted the sexiest man alive on Broadway.com. The following year, VH1 ranked him as the 28th Sexiest Artist of All Time, stating: "Ricky looks like the model in the magazine ads you stare at in awe thinking, 'There's no way he's that perfect in person'." In 2014, Entertainment Tonight listed him among the Sexiest Men Alive, while Revista Estilo placed him on the list of "the 10 Sexiest Singers" in 2016. He was ranked at number 16 on the list of "the 50 Hottest Men of All Time" by Harper's Bazaar in 2018, being the only Latin man on their list. In 2019, TN described Martin as "the sexiest man in the world". He has been noted for looking younger than his age, with Billboards Chris Payne describing him as "ageless". The singer has attended several fashion shows, including the Giorgio Armani show at Milan Fashion Week in 2011, the Marc Jacobs show in 2013, the Berluti menswear spring-summer 2020 show at Paris Fashion Week, the Dior men's pre-fall 2020 show, and the Virgil Abloh Spring-Summer 2022 show held by Louis Vuitton.

Personal life
Sexual orientation and early relationships
According to an interview with Rolling Stone in 1999, Martin experienced his first kiss at age thirteen and lost his virginity at fourteen in Argentina. In 1990, shortly after he had arrived in Mexico to star in Mama Ama el Rock, he met a woman, who was the host of a television show. They began dating quickly and broke up a few months later. In 1992, he fell in love with Mexican singer Alejandra Guzmán, who was separated from her husband at the time. They began dating until Guzmán returned to her husband and pretended Martin was her assistant on a phone call, while she was sleeping with her husband. In an interview with Univision, Martin admitted that she broke his heart. In the same year, Martin was rumored to be in a relationship with Argentine tennis player Gabriela Sabatini. Sabatini's sister-in-law, Catherine Fulop, confirmed the rumor in 2020. During the time he was playing in General Hospital, he met a "very handsome" man at a radio station, "stopped fearing [his] sexuality", and began dating him. Martin's mother supported him when she discovered that he was in love with a man, saying: "I love you, my son, I'm so happy for you. Bring it on. I'm right behind you." However, after the relationship ended, Martin "locked [his] feelings even deeper inside" and began dating women again. He recalls: "I already felt it was hard to be a Latino in Hollywood; what could have been more difficult than being Latino and gay?" Martin began dating Mexican television host Rebecca de Alba in 1994; they were in an on-and-off relationship until 2005. De Alba later revealed that she became pregnant several times in her life, but lost all of the pregnancies, expressing that one of them was by Martin. Martin also had relationships with Lilly Melgar, Adriana Biega, Maital Saban, and Inés Misan during his breakup times with de Alba in the late 1990s and early 2000s. He declared that "there was chemistry with them" and he "wasn't fooling anyone".

In August 2008, Martin became a father to twin boys named Matteo and Valentino, born via gestational surrogacy. He explained that he chose surrogacy to become a parent for being "intriguing and faster" than adoption, which was complicated and could take a long time. In March 2010, Martin publicly came out as gay via a message on his website, stating: "I am proud to say that I am a fortunate homosexual man. I am very blessed to be who I am." Years later, he revealed that although his music was "heard all over the world" and he "could high five God" in 1999, he "wasn't living to the fullest" and was sad and depressed. He kept asking himself, "Am I gay? Am I bisexual? Am I confused? What am I?", explaining: "Sexuality is one complicated thing. It's not black and white. It's filled with colors. When I was dating women, I was in love with women. It felt right, it felt beautiful." In an interview with Vanity Fair, he declared: "There was love, passion. I do not regret anything, any of the relationships I lived, they taught me a lot, both men and women." Martin also told Fama!: "I know that I like both men and women, I'm against sexual labels, we are simply human beings with emotional and sexual needs. I like to enjoy sex in total freedom, so I'm open to having sex with a woman if I feel desire." Despite this, he expressed that he would not be interested in "an ongoing relationship with a woman", stating: "Men are my thing". In 2000, American broadcast journalist Barbara Walters asked Martin about his sexuality on national television: "You could stop these rumors. You could say, 'Yes I am gay or no I'm not.'" Martin, who answered with "I just don't feel like it" at the time, later revealed that Walters' question had made him feel "violated", since he "was just not ready to come out" and was "very afraid"; he said that it resulted in "a little PTSD" that "still haunts him". Martin dated Puerto Rican economist Carlos González Abella from 2010 to 2014, as his first relationship with a man after coming out as gay.

Marriage

Syrian-Swedish painter Jwan Yosef shared a photo of himself and Martin on Instagram on March 30, 2016, with the caption: "Obviously we're starting a band." Soon it was rumored that Yosef was Martin's new boyfriend. Martin confirmed their relationship on April 18, 2016, and they made their red carpet debut as a couple at the amfAR Inspiration Gala. Martin later revealed that he met Yosef on Instagram and they "were talking for like six months without [him] hearing his voice". Subsequently, Martin went to London, where Yosef was living, and they met each other. On November 16, 2016, during an interview on The Ellen DeGeneres Show, he announced that he has proposed to Yosef and they are engaged. In January 2018, Martin confirmed that he has secretly married Yosef: "I'm a husband, but we're doing a heavy party in a couple of months, I'll let you know." On December 31, 2018, they announced that they have welcomed their first daughter together, named Lucia Martin-Yosef. Martin later explained that Lucia was born on December 24, coinciding with his 47th birthday. In September 2019, while accepting an award at the 23rd annual Human Rights Campaign (HRC) National Dinner, he announced that they are expecting their fourth child. On October 29, 2019, he shared a photo of himself, Yosef, and their newborn son, named Renn Martin-Yosef, with the caption: "Our son Renn Martin-Yosef has been born."

Beliefs and religion
During an interview with People in 2002, Martin expressed that he believes in "love", "the power of healing", and "God", thanks to his parents. The name he chose for his son Matteo means "gift from God". According to his statements in a 2021 interview, he still believes in God. He was raised Catholic but he said is not "the person who would ever look down upon one religion". He expressed that he also admires and likes Buddhist philosophy, but does not subscribe to the religion, since if he does, he cannot "be of anything else"; he does not want to be limited in certain aspects and follow a religion's specific rules. He tries to remain "open to everything" and makes "a concerted effort to always find new teachings and new paths" everywhere he goes and in every situation he finds himself in. Martin believes that everyone can "decide what makes them happy" and although "everyone needs to accept the life they were given", it does not mean they "should not live it as fully as possible".

Health and sports
Martin began practicing yoga after a trip to Thailand in 1997. He also began practicing meditation following a trip to India. In 2021, he explained that he gets up every morning at 5:30, before his family and puts himself in a lotus position and oxygenates his body. He also expressed that has a gym in his house, saying: "If I have space to see myself in the mirror and put on my products, then I also have to have space for my body." During an appearance on The Dr. Oz Show in 2017, Martin revealed that he "was diagnosed with high cholesterol" at age eighteen. Although he did not pay attention to the high cholesterol at the time, it made him decide to become a vegetarian since 2013 to reduce cholesterol, despite loving meat as "a Latin man". In 2020, he opened up that he suffered from anxiety for the first time in his life, following the COVID-19 lockdowns, stating that making music became his "medicine".

Real estate
In March 2001, Martin purchased a 7,082-square-foot house in Miami Beach for $6.4 million; he sold the unit for $10.6 million in 2005. In September 2004, he paid $11.9 million for an 11,000-square-foot Mediterranean-style villa in Los Angeles, which he sold in 2006 for $15 million. In May 2005, he purchased a 9,491-square-foot house in Miami Beach for $10 million; he sold the villa for $10.6 million in 2012. In 2007, he paid $16.2 million for a mansion in Golden Beach. He sold the property in 2012 for $12.8 million, incurring a loss. In the same year, he bought a 3,147-square-foot condominium in New York City for $5.9 million; he sold the condo for $7.1 million in 2017. In 2014, he rented a 900-square-metre mansion in Sydney, which became famous as "the Bronte Wave House" and was sold for $16 million in May 2015, marking one of the most expensive properties sold in the city that year. In December 2016, he purchased an 11,300-square-foot mansion in Beverly Hills. The estate, which is Martin's current house, has seven bedrooms and eight bathrooms with outdoor seating areas scattered throughout 33,000 square feet. It is a "private getaway in the middle of the city", located up the street from the Beverly Hills Hotel. Martin also owns a property in Puerto Rico and a private 19.7-acre island in Brazil. He purchased the latter for $8 million in 2008.

Legacy
Martin has been regarded as the "King of Latin Pop" by various publications, such as the Grammy Awards, Billboard, Rolling Stone, Time, People, Vogue, The Independent, Entertainment Weekly, Entertainment Tonight Canada, NBC News, and ABC News. Additionally, he has been referred to as the "King of Latin Music", the "Latin Pop God", the "Latin King of Pop", the "Latin American King of Pop", the "Latin King", the "Crossover Latin King", the "Puerto Rican Pop King", the "Salsa-Pop King", and the "King of World Cup". Martin is known as one of the most influential artists in the world. Billboard ranked him as one of the 30 Most Influential Latin Artists of All Time, while NBC News introduced him as an "influential Latin celebrity". In 2014, he won the award for the most influential international artist at the 18th China Music Awards. He was ranked among "25 musicians who broke barriers" by Stacker in 2019, while in 2020, Spin ranked him at number 27 on the list of "most influential artists of the past 35 years", as the only Latin artist on their list. In 2022, Show News named him "the most influential global artist in history".

Martin's song "María (Pablo Flores Remix)", which was ranked among the "Greatest Latin Pop Song of All Time" by Rolling Stone, and "11 remixes of classic Latin hits" by Billboard, "launched the Latin and dance music crossover of the '90s", according to the latter. Olivier Pérou from Le Point commented that "some have even learned, thanks to him, to count to three in Spanish" following the popularity of the song. "La Copa de la Vida", which has been hailed as the Best World Cup Anthem of All-Time by multiple sources, became a "musical template" for World Cup anthems, and Martin's Latin and dance crossover style has been much copied in the anthems, as well as soccer chant "Ole! Ole! Ole!" in the lyrics, according to The Hollywood Reporter. As believed by Esquire, the song "inaugurated this musical subgenre" of Latin. In his review for Pitchfork, Corban Goble wrote that if World Cup anthems someday would be "given their own textbook", "La Copa de la Vida" would be "the standard-bearer for the whole genre".

Martin is known as the pioneer in getting Latin pop music genre to mainstream recognition. Following his performance of "The Cup of Life" at the Grammys, and the success of "Livin' la Vida Loca" and Ricky Martin (1999), he opened the gates for many Latin artists such as Jennifer Lopez, Shakira, Christina Aguilera, Marc Anthony, Santana, and Enrique Iglesias who released their crossover albums and followed him onto the top of the charts. His performance of "The Cup of Life" at the Grammys not only changed the course of his career, but also altered how people regard Latin music in America. It has been known as a game-changer for Latin music worldwide, that effectively ushered in the "Latin explosion". Then-United Talent Agency head Rob Prinz described the rendition as "the single biggest game changing moment for any artist in the history of the Grammys". According to Billboard, it has been cited as the beginning of the "Latin Pop invasion", which powerfully affected the US mainstream. According to Entertainment Tonight, "Livin' la Vida Loca" paved the way for a large number of other Latin artists, and is "credited as the song that helped other Latin artists break through to English-speaking markets". According to The Independent, the single is "widely regarded as the song that began the first Latin pop explosion", while Peoples Jason Sheeler credited it as the song that "led the way for the late-'90s so-called 'Latin explosion' that dominated pop music into the new century: Shakira, Enrique Iglesias, Marc Anthony, and Jennifer Lopez". Angie Romero from Billboard wrote: "If you look up 'crossover' in the dictionary, there should be a photo of Ricky shaking his bon bon and/or 'Livin' la Vida Loca'."

Jim Farber from Daily News noted that Ricky Martin "provides a textbook example of how to mix Latin beats with pop tunes and rock intonations". St. Louis Post-Dispatch critic Kevin C. Johnson stated that Martin took "the music to places Jon Secada, Selena and Santana never could". He also mentioned that even "Gloria Estefan at her peak, failed to muster up the kind of hype and hoopla surrounding Martin". Celia San Miguel of Tidal Magazine stated that Martin "highlighted the public's thirst for a different kind of pop" in 1999, crediting "Martin and the paths he created" responsible for the Latin music and Spanish and Spanglish lyrics being "a commonplace phenomenon on English-language radio" in 2019. In her review for Grammy.com, Ana Monroy Yglesias said Martin led a "major music moment in 1999" with Ricky Martin, and along with him, "the first major boom of Spanish-language artists", such as Shakira and Lopez, came into the "U.S. pop landscape".

The late 1990s Latin explosion also resulted in the launch of the Latin Recording Academy. Gabriel Abaroa Jr., the president and chief executive officer of the Latin Recording Academy, expressed that the plan of its launch was "immediately after the Ricky Martin success". Cuban American musician and producer Emilio Estefan added: "After the success with Ricky Martin, everybody opened their eyes and realized how important it was to bring diversity and multiethnic elements into [mainstream American] music." Many artists have cited Martin as an influence or declared themselves as his fan, including Abraham Mateo, Bad Bunny, Camila Cabello, Camilo, Carla Morrison, Christian Chávez, CNCO, Danna Paola, Enrique Iglesias, J Balvin, J-Hope, Jimin, Karol G, India Martínez, Luis Fonsi, Maite Perroni, Maluma, Neha Mahajan, Pedro Capó, Prince Royce, Rauw Alejandro, Reik, Rosalía, Sebastián Ligarde, Sebastián Yatra, Shakira, Tini, Vadhir Derbez, William Hung, Wisin, and Ximena Sariñana.

Both Maluma and J Balvin have described Martin as a "teacher" and credited him as an artist who "opened the doors" for them, while Maluma has also expressed: "Ricky Martin is one of the artists I wanted to be growing up. He's my idol in the industry."Citations regarding J Balvin's statements about Martin:
 
 
  Spanish singer Rosalía also cited Martin as a "teacher". Puerto Rican singer Bad Bunny talked about Martin's legacy during an episode of Behind the Music: "There's no doubt that he opened the door for an entire generation of Latin artists. I am doing great things today in the music industry thanks to those doors that he opened." He also mentioned that he is inspired by Martin's coming out as gay: "You don't have to be gay to be inspired by that action of honesty and freedom, of being yourself against the world despite everything you deserve. I look at it like a very inspiring moment for anybody. At least for me, it's very inspirational." Brazilian singer-songwriter Anitta explained to The Guardian that "some Latin stars such as Maluma and Bad Bunny sing in their native language" and do not need to sing in English to get noticed, because they already had representatives like Shakira, Martin, and Jennifer Lopez, but since her country "hasn't had a major international pop star before", she uses "whatever language will get the market's attention".

Portrayal in television

In July 2019, SOMOS Productions, Endemol Shine Boomdog, and Piñolywood Studios announced the production of a biographical web television series about Menudo, titled Subete a Mi Moto. Consisting of 15 episodes of 60 minutes each, the series premiered on Amazon Prime Video on October 9, 2020, in Mexico, Latin America, and Spain. It was filmed in Mexico and Puerto Rico, and Martin was portrayed by actors Felipe Albors and Ethan Schwartz. The series premiered in the United States on February 14, 2021, on Estrella TV. On the review aggregation website Tomatazos, the first season has a positive score of 75%. The website's critical consensus summary states, "A good trip to the past that recalls a band that defined the youth of a certain public, but that doesn't ignore the darkest moments in the lives of its members."

Other ventures
Books
On August 19, 2010, Martin announced that he had been working on his memoir, mentioning its title as Me and publish date as November 2, 2010. He expressed that writing the book was "one of the reasons" he decided to come out earlier that year. The book also had a Spanish edition title Yo, which was published simultaneously by Celebra. He stated that writing his memoir allowed him "to explore the different paths and experiences" that have led him to be who he is, noting that it "was not easy but allowed for an incredible spiritual journey". Me spent several weeks at number one on the New York Times Best Seller list. In 2019, ¡Hola! staff ranked the book among "12 Books by Celebrities to Inspire and Motivate You", while Book Riot placed it on an unranked list of the "Best Celebrity Books You Should Read This Year" in 2020. Martin's first children's book Santiago the Dreamer in Land Among the Stars was published by Celebra and illustrated by Patricia Castelao in November 2013 for ages between five and nine. Its Spanish-language edition, Santiago El Soñador en Entre Las Estrellas, was published simultaneously. Martin expressed that the book was inspired by his "personal life, with fantasy added to it", as well as "a lot of cartoons".

Products and endorsements
Martin endorsed the 2012 Viva Glam campaign with rapper Nicki Minaj, which raised $270 million for the Mac AIDS Fund. In October 2020, Martin announced that he would launch his company, Martin Music Lab in partnership with music engineers Jaycen Joshua and Michael Seaberg. The company is centered around a new audio technique called "Orbital Audio", that "creates a new type of immersive, headphone listening experience". Martin used the technique on his EP Pausa, while several artists including Bad Bunny, Residente, Myke Towers, and A$AP Rocky are going to work with the company. The latter plans to release his whole upcoming studio album, using "Orbital Audio". Martin is going to expand the technique "beyond the music industry and tap into the movies, sports and, most notably, the wellness and meditation space". In 2021, Martin partnered with skin care company Kumiko. The skincare line, created by Chilean cosmetologist Catalina Aguirre, is the first to combine "mesotherapy, matcha, and cutting-edge European technology into unique multi-action formulas that penetrate the dermis with powerful anti-aging properties and lifting benefits".

 Activism 
 Philanthropy 

While on a trip to India in 2002, Martin witnessed three minor girls who were about to be sold into prostitution and rescued them. The following year, he became a UNICEF Goodwill Ambassador and then met with activists and decided to fight against human trafficking, which is the second-most lucrative crime in the world. In 2004, Martin launched the Ricky Martin Foundation, a non-profit, non-governmental organization that focuses on denouncing human trafficking and educating about the crime's "existence through research and community initiatives, anchored in the defense of children and youth rights". In the same year, he appealed to the United Nations for international help to fight against sex tourism. In January 2005, following the 2004 Indian Ocean earthquake and tsunami, Martin visited Thailand to assess the needs of the minor survivors who were "extremely vulnerable to traffickers". Later that year, the Ricky Martin Foundation signed an alliance in partnership with Habitat for Humanity to construct 224 homes for the tsunami-affected families. The project was completed in December 2006. In March 2006, the foundation collaborated with the International Organization for Migration in the Llama y Vive campaign, which focuses on facilitating "the prevention of human trafficking and the protection of young people, victims of child trafficking and prosecution of traffickers".

In January 2010, along with many celebrities, Martin operated the charity telethon Hope for Haiti Now to raise donations for the 2010 Haiti earthquake. Later that year, the Ricky Martin Foundation created the first program of community social action against child trafficking in Martin's native Puerto Rico, titled "Se Trata". In 2012, the foundation participated in the making of the Child Protection Model Law on the International Centre for Missing & Exploited Children. In 2016, Martin visited Syrian refugees in Lebanon and played with the children and talked to them in an informal refugee camp. Following the Hurricane Maria in Puerto Rico in 2017, the Ricky Martin Foundation helped people and handed over homes that were rebuilt after the losses; Martin launched a viral campaign of selling a black T-shirt with the Puerto Rican flag stamped on it in order to raise the funds. The T-shirts were designed by Martin's twin boys Matteo and Valentino, while many celebrities including Will Smith, Bad Bunny, Marc Anthony, Luis Fonsi, and Maluma supported the campaign. During the COVID-19 pandemic, Martin created a campaign to help health care workers through the non-profit organization Project Hope. He expressed: "As you know, health care professionals are extremely vulnerable and professionals around the world don’t have personal protection equipment they need to prevent them getting infected." In February 2021, Martin collaborated with Antonia Novello to launch mass vaccination events in Puerto Rico. Following the murder of George Floyd and Black Lives Matter protests in 2020, Martin honored an effort called "Black Out Tuesday" and launched the hashtag #knowthestruggle, giving his social media to the voices of the community that are "looking for justice", to learn more about what is happening.

For his humanitarian efforts and fighting against human trafficking, Martin has been honored with numerous accolades, including the Peace Summit Award by the World Summit of Nobel Peace Laureates, the TIP Report Hero Award by the United States Department of State, the Spirit of Hope Award by Billboard Latin Music Awards, the Latin Recording Academy Person of the Year Award, the Award of Inspiration by amfAR Gala, the Leader of Change Award by the Foundation for Social Change, the Humanitarian Award by the Global Gift Foundation, the Humanitarian Award by the Hispanic Federation, the Corazón Latino Award by the iHeartRadio Fiesta Latina, the International Humanitarian Award by the International Center for Missing and Exploited Children, the Agent of Change Award by the International Peace Honors, the PODER Social Leadership Awards, and the Agent of Change Award by the Premios Juventud.

 Politics 

On January 20, 2001, during the first inauguration of George W. Bush, Martin performed "The Cup of Life" and danced with him. Martin's view of Bush changed over the Iraq War, as expressed in his declaration to BBC News that he will "always condemn war and those who promulgate it". He also stuck up his middle finger while singing the president's name in his 2003 song "Asignatura Pendiente" at a concert. At the 2010 Billboard Latin Music Awards, Martin expressed his disagreement with the Arizona SB 1070 bill, a proposed law that would have required police officers to request documents from individuals whom they suspected to be illegal immigrants. Martin campaigned for the 44th president of the United States Barack Obama in 2008 and 2012, and thanked him for an "outstanding presidency" in 2016, while calling him "an amazing leader". Also in 2016, he was an active ally to the Democratic Party presidential candidate Hillary Clinton campaign, while condemning Donald Trump's hateful comments about immigrants. He also performed his hits during the "Hillary Clinton: She's With Us" concert at the Greek Theatre on June 6, 2016.

Telegramgate, also known as Chatgate, was a political scandal involving Ricardo Rosselló, then Governor of Puerto Rico, which began on July 8, 2019, with the leak of hundreds of pages of a group chat on the messaging application Telegram between Rosselló and members of his cabinet. The messages were considered vulgar, misogynistic, and homophobic toward several individuals and groups, including Martin. Therefore, Martin, Bad Bunny, Residente and several other artists, and more than half a million Puerto Ricans led the call to take to the streets of Puerto Rico, demanding Rosselló's resignation. In September 2020, Martin, Luis Fonsi, and actress Eva Longoria attended a campaign event in Kissimmee, Florida to support the Democratic presidential candidate Joe Biden for the 2020 United States presidential election. During an interview with Variety, Martin stated: "I've been supporting Biden forever, I think he is the only option we have and he is great and he has been in politics all his life. This is the moment. We all need to get together and be loud about the course of this nation." Following the election of Biden as 46th president of the United States, Martin said "Bye-bye" to Trump on social media, and shared a photo of himself along with Biden on Instagram.

In May 2021, Martin demonstrated his support for the Ni una menos movement, condemning femicides and violence against women in Puerto Rico, while calling authorities to protect women. He further expressed that no woman should fear for her safety and urged authorities to take steps in order to prevent these acts. In the same month, he supported the 2021 Colombian protests. Later that year, the singer raised his voice in support of the 2021 Cuban protests against the Castro regime for the restrictions due to the COVID-19 pandemic and the economic crisis, stating: "This is very important. Our brothers and sisters in Cuba need us to inform the world what they are experiencing today. Let's fill the networks before they remove the internet in the country. Humanitarian aid for Cuba NOW."

 LGBT advocacy 

As a gay man, Martin actively supports LGBT rights worldwide since his coming out in 2010. Even before coming out, he was noted by the mainstream media for being popular among gay men and having a large gay fan base. He also went on the cover of the American LGBT-interest magazine The Advocate in July 1999. Despite this, he admitted that he felt homosexuality was evil since he was raised as a Catholic and targeted his anger toward others, especially gay men: "I was very angry, very rebellious. I used to look at gay men and think, 'I'm not like that, I don't want to be like that, that's not me.' I was ashamed." He added that he "had internalized homophobia" back then. He is currently considered to be a gay icon, with PinkNews labeling him "a strong advocate of LGBT rights" who "expressed support for equal marriage" since coming out.

As the first mainstream Latin music artist to come out, Martin's coming out was a game-changer for "Latin Pride". Billboards Lucas Villa stated: "With Martin's announcement, gay artists, who had long kept their sexual identities a secret, finally had a beacon of hope. If Martin could come out with his career unscathed, there was hope for other artists in Latin music to start doing the same." He added that since then, "a growing number of Latin artists have either come out after years in the spotlight, or many have simply started their careers by embracing their gay identities". In 2010, GLAAD then-president Jarrett Barrios expressed that Martin's coming out as gay leads "hundreds of millions of people" to have "a cultural connection with an artist, a celebrity and, perhaps most importantly, a father who happens to be gay", adding that "his decision to model this kind of openness and honesty can lead to greater acceptance for countless gay people in U.S., in Latin America and worldwide". In 2019, Human Rights Campaign then-president Alphonso David expressed that Martin "has used his international stage to advocate for LGBTQ people around the world" with his "unique voice and passionate activism". The following year, Suzy Exposito from Rolling Stone argued that with risking his career and coming out, Martin "set the scene for Bad Bunny to be free in many ways that, during his own breakthrough moment, he could not".

Martin expressed support for same-sex marriage during an interview on Larry King Live in 2010. He has then delivered speeches about LGBT rights at the United Nations Homophobia Conference, the GLAAD Media Awards, and the Human Rights Campaign. He also raised his voice to support gay marriage in Puerto Rico before its legalization in 2015. In March 2016, Martin met with Chilean LGBT rights group Fundación Iguales to learn about the challenges LGBT citizens face there. AT the meeting, he said that he wants "equal marriage rights for Chile" and he wants his sons to grow up in a world where "there are no second-class citizens". Following the Colombia's highest court voting against an anti same-sex marriage proposal in April 2016, Martin tweeted: "Love and equality win, Colombia says YES to same-sex marriage." During an interview with Vulture, Martin talked about his role in The Assassination of Gianni Versace and how he wanted his portrayal to help "normalize open relationships". In June 2019, he published an open letter slamming the religious liberty bill, saying: "As a defender of human rights and a member of the LGBTT community, I am vehemently opposed to the proposed measure imposed upon us under the guise of religious freedom, that projects us to the world as a backwards country." Puerto Rico's then-governor backed down and withdrew his support of the bill following Martin's statement. In June 2020, Martin performed his song "Recuerdo" with Carla Morrison for a virtual event, Can't Cancel Pride: Helping LGBTQ+ People in Need, to raise visibility and funds for LGBTQ+ communities. He appeared at the virtual event in the following year as well. In February 2021, Martin was named national spokesperson for the onePULSE Foundation, a non-profit organization that focuses on managing "the design and construction of the permanent national memorial and museum dedicated to the Pulse nightclub tragedy". Later that year, he expressed that he wants to "normalize families like" his, in an interview with People.

Several of Martin's music videos feature diversity in sexual orientations and same-sex couples, including "The Best Thing About Me Is You", "Disparo al Corazón", "Fiebre", and "Tiburones". For his activism and advocacy for LGBTQ community, Martin has been honored with numerous accolades, including the GLAAD Vito Russo Award, the Gala Vanguard Award by the Los Angeles LGBT Center, the International Icon Award by the British LGBT Awards, the National Visibility Award by the Human Rights Campaign, the Trailblazer Award by the LGBT Center Dinner, the Celebrity Activist of the Year by LGBTQ Nation, and the Legacy Award by Attitude Awards.

Achievements

Throughout his career, Martin has won over 200 awards (most awarded male Latin artist), including two Grammy Awards, five Latin Grammy Awards, five MTV Video Music Awards (tied for most wins by a Latin artist), two American Music Awards, three Latin American Music Awards, three Billboard Music Awards, a Billboard Music Video Award, nine Billboard Latin Music Awards, eight World Music Awards, fourteen Lo Nuestro Awards (including the Excellence Award), and a Guinness World Record. As an actor, he was nominated for an Emmy Award. In 2007, Martin was honored with a star on the Hollywood Walk of Fame, located at 6901 Hollywood Blvd.

Martin is ranked among the Greatest Latin Artists of All Time and the Greatest Hot Latin Songs Artists of All Time by Billboard, while his album Vuelve was placed at number five on Billboards Top 20 Latin Albums Of All Time in 2018. In 1998, his song, "Perdido Sin Ti" reached the top of the Latin Pop Airplay chart, displacing Martin's own "Vuelve", making him the first artist on the chart's history to replace himself. His song "Livin' la Vida Loca" became the first number-one song on Billboard Hot 100, which was made entirely in Pro Tools, and achieved the first number one hit for his label, Columbia. It also became the first song in history to top Billboards Adult Pop Airplay, Pop Airplay, and Rhythmic Airplay charts, holding its record as the only song to do so for 14 years. On May 15, 1999, it became the first single ever to rule four different Billboard charts and made Martin the first act to simultaneously scale a pop, Latin, and dance chart. Two weeks later, he became the first artist to simultaneously top the Billboard 200, Hot Latin Tracks, Hot Dance Music/Club Play, Hot Dance Music/Maxi-Singles Sales, Top 40 Tracks, and the Billboard Hot 100. His song "Tal Vez" (2003) marked the first number one debut on Billboard Hot Latin Songs in the 21st century. Martin is the first and only artist with Spanish-language entries on Billboard Hot 100 in three decades. In 2020, he became the first and only artist in history to enter the Billboard Hot Latin Songs chart across five decades, including his work as part of Menudo. The following year, he became the first male Latin artist in history to have 4 songs from different decades to have over 100 million streams on Spotify. He owns the record as the artist with most top 20s on the US Latin Pop Airplay chart, with 51 songs, and is the runner-up of most top 10s. He is the fourth artist with the most number one songs in the history of the Hot Latin Songs chart. Additionally, he holds the record as the most Spanish-language entries on ARIA top 50 singles chart, with three.

On October 11, 2007, then-mayor of Miami Beach, Florida David Dermer awarded him the key to the city of Miami Beach. Puerto Rico named August 31 the "International Ricky Martin Day" in 2008. The Government of Spain granted Spanish nationality to Martin in 2011, for being "recognized in different artistic facets". In 2018, in recognition of "his dedication to the island and people of Puerto Rico, his philanthropic work to eliminate human trafficking across the Caribbean, and his commitment to the arts", the singer received a proclamation naming June 7 the "Ricky Martin Day" in New York City. Throughout his career, Martin has sold over 70 million records making him one of the best-selling Latin music artists of all time. In 2022, La Nación estimated his net worth at US$130 million.

Discography

 Ricky Martin (1991)
 Me Amaras (1993)
 A Medio Vivir (1995)
 Vuelve (1998)
 Ricky Martin (1999)
 Sound Loaded (2000)
 Almas del Silencio (2003)
 Life (2005)
 Música + Alma + Sexo (2011)
 A Quien Quiera Escuchar (2015)

Filmography

 Mas Que Alcanzar una estrella (1992)
 Hercules – Latin American dub (1997)
 Idle Hands (1999)
 Ricky Martin: One Night Only (1999)
 Minions – Latin American dub (2015)
 The Latin Explosion: A New America (2015)
 Ricky Martin: Behind the Vegas Residency (2017)
 Jingle Jangle: A Christmas Journey (2020)
 El cuartito (2021)

Theatre
Les Misérables (1996), Broadway – Marius Pontmercy
Evita (2012), Broadway – Ché

Tours and residenciesHeadlining tours Ricky Martin Tour (1992)
 Me Amaras Tour (1993–1994)
 A Medio Vivir Tour (1995–1997)
 Vuelve World Tour (1998)
 Livin' la Vida Loca Tour (1999–2000)
 One Night Only with Ricky Martin (2005–2006)
 Black and White Tour (2007)
 Música + Alma + Sexo World Tour (2011)
 Ricky Martin Live (2013–2014)
 Live in Mexico (2014)
 One World Tour (2015–2018)
 Ricky Martin en Concierto (2018-2019)
 Movimiento Tour (2020-2022)
 Sinfónico Tour (2022-2023)Co-headlining tour Enrique Iglesias and Ricky Martin Live in Concert (with Enrique Iglesias) (2021)Residency'
 All In (2017–2018)

See also
 Honorific nicknames in popular music
 List of artists who reached number one in the United States
 List of artists who reached number one on the UK Singles Chart
 List of Latin pop artists
 List of multilingual bands and artists
 List of Puerto Rican Grammy Award winners and nominees
 List of Puerto Ricans
 List of Urbano artists

Notes

References

Book sources

External links

 
 
 
 
 

 
1971 births
Living people
20th-century Puerto Rican LGBT people
20th-century Puerto Rican male actors
20th-century Puerto Rican male singers
21st-century Puerto Rican LGBT people
21st-century Puerto Rican male actors
21st-century Puerto Rican male singers
Puerto Rican gay actors
Puerto Rican gay musicians
Puerto Rican gay writers
Gay singers
Gay songwriters
Columbia Records artists
Echo (music award) winners
Grammy Award winners
Hispanic and Latino American male actors
Hispanic and Latino American musicians
Latin Grammy Award winners
Latin music songwriters
Latin pop singers
Latin Recording Academy Person of the Year honorees
Puerto Rican LGBT singers
Puerto Rican LGBT songwriters
LGBT Hispanic and Latino American people
LGBT people in Latin music
LGBT record producers
Male actors from San Juan, Puerto Rico
Menudo (band) members
MTV Europe Music Award winners
Naturalised citizens of Spain
Puerto Rican activists
Puerto Rican expatriates in Australia
Puerto Rican expatriates in Mexico
Puerto Rican expatriates in Spain
Puerto Rican male film actors
Puerto Rican male soap opera actors
Puerto Rican male television actors
Puerto Rican people of Basque descent
Puerto Rican people of Canarian descent
Puerto Rican people of Corsican descent
Puerto Rican people of Spanish descent
Puerto Rican philanthropists
Puerto Rican pop singers
Puerto Rican record producers
Puerto Rican male singer-songwriters
Singers from San Juan, Puerto Rico
Sony Music Latin artists
Sony Music Spain artists
Spanish-language singers of the United States
UNICEF Goodwill Ambassadors
World Music Awards winners
Fifa World Cup ceremonies performers